The Revd Dom Felix Stephens, OSB (born 6 August 1942 in Montpellier, Cheltenham, Gloucestershire) was Master of St Benet's Hall, Oxford from 2007 to 2012.

Born as John Patrick Rhodes Stephens, he was educated at Ampleforth College, where he was a member of St Hugh's House, and at St Benet's Hall, Oxford. During this time, he played three first-class cricket matches for Oxford University Cricket Club as a right-handed opening or upper order batsman.

On profession as a Benedictine monk he took the name Felix. He taught at Ampleforth College, serving as Procurator, Housemaster of St Bede's, and Second Master, as well as coaching the 1st XI (cricket). He is Editor of Ampleforth Journal and was formerly Honorary Secretary of the Ampleforth Society. He has also been Parish Priest of St Mary's Church, Warrington.

In 2003 he was celebrant at the funeral of Hugo Young. In September 2007 he became the tenth Master of St Benet's Hall, Oxford.

References

External links
 Ampleforth website

1942 births
Living people
20th-century British Roman Catholic theologians
20th-century English Roman Catholic priests
21st-century English Roman Catholic priests
People educated at Ampleforth College
Alumni of St Benet's Hall, Oxford
Sportspeople from Cheltenham
English Benedictines
Masters of St Benet's Hall, Oxford
English cricketers
Oxford University cricketers
Sportspeople from Yorkshire